The National Council of Government and Public Workers' Unions (Zenkanko) was a national trade union federation representing public sector workers in Japan.

The federation was founded on 26 November 1946, and in its early years frequently organised strikes in order to improve public sector wages.  While many of its affiliates were also members of Sanbetsu, others were independent.

By 1958, the federation claimed 2,404,179 members.  The federation aligned itself with the Democratic Socialist Party and the right wing of the labour movement.  On 13 November 1964, it merged with the All-Japan Trade Union Congress and the Japanese Federation of Labour, to form the Japanese Confederation of Labour (Domei).

The federation remained in existence, and many of its affiliates chose to affiliate with Sohyo rather than with Domei.  In 2003, it merged with the Council of Public Corporation and Government Enterprise Workers' Unions, the Congress for Joint Struggles of Public Workers' Unions of Japan, to form the Alliance of Public Services Workers' Unions.

Affiliates
The following unions were affiliated in 1958:

References

Public sector trade unions
Trade unions established in 1946
Trade unions disestablished in 2003
Trade unions in Japan